Mutnofret (“Mut is Beautiful”), also rendered as Mutneferet or Mutnefert, was a queen during the Eighteenth Dynasty of Egypt. She was a secondary wife of Thutmose I—Queen Ahmose was the chief wife—and the mother of Thutmose II.

Based on her titles of King's Daughter and King's Sister, she is likely to have been a daughter of Ahmose I and a sister of Amenhotep I. It is likely that she was also the mother of Thutmose I's other sons, Amenmose, Wadjmose and Ramose.

She was depicted in the Deir el-Bahri temple built by her grandson Thutmose III; on a stela found at the Ramesseum; on the colossus of her son; and a statue of her bearing a dedication by Thutmose II was found in Wadjmose's chapel. This suggests that Mutnofret was still alive during her son's reign.

Sources

External links
Hatshepsut: from Queen to Pharaoh, an exhibition catalog from The Metropolitan Museum of Art (fully available online as PDF), which contains material on Mutnofret (see index)

Queens consort of the Eighteenth Dynasty of Egypt
16th-century BC Egyptian women
15th-century BC Egyptian women
Thutmose I
Children of Ahmose I